Canynges is a surname. Notable people with the surname include:

 John Canynges (died 1405), member of Parliament for Bristol
 Thomas Canynges (fl. 1450), Lord Mayor of London 
 William II Canynges ( 1399–1474), English merchant